Émile Fernand Semelaigne (born 15 November 1865, date of death unknown) was a French fencer. He competed in the men's sabre event at the 1900 Summer Olympics.

References

External links
 

1865 births
Year of death missing
French male sabre fencers
Olympic fencers of France
Fencers at the 1900 Summer Olympics
Sportspeople from Neuilly-sur-Seine
Place of death missing